Thangal Uppapa (Arabic: تنغل اباب; died 6 September 1962) was a Muslim holy man from Kollam, Kerala.

His tomb, located at Nellikunnu Muhyaddin Juma Masjid, Nellikunnu, 2 km away from Kasaragod, is pilgrimage centre. His works and services in Kasargod and Mangalore are regarded by his Muslim community as worthy and peerless.

Early life
He was born in Kollam, Kerala and travelled many places. During his staying at Mangalore he attracted huge crowds. Eventually he settled at Nellikunnu and lived there until his death.

Death
He died on September 6, 1962. His tomb is located now in Nellikunnu.

References

1962 deaths
Indian Islamic religious leaders
Year of birth missing